Chongshen Mongkosungkum Chang (1 April 1942 – 12 October 2020) was an Indian politician. He belonged to the Nationalist Democratic Progressive Party.

Early life 
Chang was born in Noksen in Tuensang district. He graduated from Guwahati University. He married Mrs. Alemla and they had five sons and five daughters. They lived in Dimapur. He died at Naga Hospital Authority, Kohima due to typhoid fever and complications from COVID-19 during the COVID-19 pandemic in India.

Career 
Chang served as an Indian Administrative Service officer. He worked as Secretary in the Department of Youth Resources and Sports in the Government of Nagaland. He retired from this position in 2002 to contest his first unsuccessful 2003 Nagaland Legislative Assembly (NLA) General Election. He lost for the second time in the 2008 general election.

In the 2009 election he was elected to the 15th Lok Sabha from the Nagaland Lok Sabha constituency. In the 2013 Nagaland Legislative Assembly elections, he was elected from 51/Noksen (Vidhan Sabha constituency) and became Minister of Education. He contested 2003, 2008, and 2013 general elections as well as the 2009 Lok Sabha election from NPF party ticket. In 2018, he joined the Nationalist Democratic Progressive Party and won the general election for NLA for the second time and was appointed Minister for Environment, Forest & Climate change, and Justice & Law.

References

External links
 Fifteenth Lok Sabha Members Bioprofile in Lok Sabha website

1942 births
2020 deaths
India MPs 2009–2014
People from Tuensang district
Indian Christians
Naga People's Front politicians
Lok Sabha members from Nagaland
Nationalist Democratic Progressive Party politicians
Nagaland MLAs 2018–2023
Deaths from typhoid fever
Infectious disease deaths in India
Deaths from the COVID-19 pandemic in India